Tonale may refer to:

Alfa Romeo Tonale, a small SUV introduced in 2022
Monte Tonale, Lombardy, Italy
Tonale Pass